Bantwal Vaikunta Baliga (1895–1968) was a Konkani lawyer who played an active role in Indian governance and politics. He was actively involved in India’s struggle for freedom and worked several times with Mahatma Gandhi. He was elected as MLA and subsequently became the Law Minister and Speaker of Mysore State Assembly. He died while he was the Speaker of Mysore State assembly. His term as Speaker spanned from March 1962 to June 1968. He is remembered for his parliamentary acumen, knowledge of legislative business, and understanding of parliamentary procedure.  As the Speaker he was known to be very strict in conducting the House proceedings.

He was also the founder president of Karnataka Library Association.

The Vaikunta Baliga College of Law was established in the year 1957 and is named after Late Sri. Bantwal Vaikunta Baliga, a legal luminary and then minister of Law, Government of Mysore.

Baliga married a woman named Sharada. They have several sons and daughters.

References

http://www.kla.kar.nic.in/assembly/elib/pdf/eresources/Vaikunta%20Baaliga.pdf

1895 births
1968 deaths
Karnataka politicians
20th-century Indian lawyers
People from Dakshina Kannada district
Indian independence activists from Karnataka